Aruba competed at the 2019 World Aquatics Championships in Gwangju, South Korea from 12 to 28 July.

Artistic swimming

Aruba's artistic swimming team consisted of 2 athletes (2 female).

Women

Swimming

Aruba has entered four swimmers.

Men

Women

References

World Aquatics Championships
2019
Nations at the 2019 World Aquatics Championships